Greetland and Stainland are villages in the metropolitan borough of Calderdale, West Yorkshire, England, and together with the surrounding area form the ward of Greetland and Stainland.  The ward contains 144 listed buildings that are recorded in the National Heritage List for England.  Of these, four are at Grade II*, the middle of the three grades, and the others are at Grade II, the lowest grade.  In addition to the villages of Greetland and Stainland, the ward contains smaller settlements, including Holywell Green, Jagger Green, Norland, Old Lindley, Outlane, Sowood, and West Vale, and the rest of the ward is rural.  Most of the listed buildings are houses and associated structures, cottages, laithe houses, farmhouses, and farm buildings, almost all of which are built in stone with stone slate roofs and mullioned windows.  The other listed buildings include a stretch of monastic walling, a cross, churches and associated structures, the remains of a set of village stocks, public houses, milestones, former textile mills, boundary stones, a canal milepost, former warehouses, items in Shaw Park, a stone trough on the site of a holy well, a Sunday school, a public hall, two railway viaducts, and a telephone kiosk.


Key

Buildings

References

Citations

Sources

Lists of listed buildings in West Yorkshire